Enrique López-Pérez and Jeevan Nedunchezhiyan were the defending champions but chose not to defend their title.

Denys Molchanov and Sergiy Stakhovsky won the title after defeating Kevin Krawietz and Adrián Menéndez-Maceiras 6–4, 7–6(9–7) in the final.

Seeds

Draw

References

External links
 Main draw

Karshi Challenger - Doubles
2017 Doubles